"Ena Lepto" (Greek: Ένα Λεπτό) is an uptempo ballad by Greek-Swedish singer Helena Paparizou and is the second single of the new album Ti Ora Tha Vgoume?. The song is written by singer-songwriter Giorgos Papadopoulos and Akis Petrou and produced by Leonidas Tzitzos.

Release and Promo
Ena Lepto was released via EMI Greece's YouTube channel on 19 April 2013. Paparizou performed the song at MadWalk 2013.

References

2013 singles
Helena Paparizou songs
2013 songs
Greek-language songs